Tanunda railway station is located on the Barossa Valley line. It served the town of Tanunda.

History
Tanunda station opened on 8 September 1911 when the Barossa Valley line to Angaston opened. In 1913, the original wooden shelter was replaced with the current stone building.

Until the 1970s a pedestrian overpass was provided. The goods and passing sidings were removed in the 1990s but the goods platform and shed remain. From 1998 to 2003 the Barossa Wine Train serviced the station.

Local radio station 5BBB has occupied the station building since the mid-1990s.

References

Disused railway stations in South Australia
Railway stations in Australia opened in 1911